Volodymyr Mykhaylovych Homenyuk (born 19 July 1985 in Bokiyma, Rivne Oblast, Ukraine) is a retired Ukrainian football forward. He has been nicknamed the Wayne Rooney of Crimea.

Career

Club
Before joining Tavriya in the winter of 2005, he played for Ikva Mlyniv. Homenyuk joined Tavriya when he was only 19 years old, and became an integral part of the team and soon became the captain.

Homenyuk joined FC Dnipro Dnipropetrovsk on 6 January 2009, signing a contract until 31 December 2013. His transfer involved Dnipro giving up Maksym Startsev to Tavriya Simferopol as well as money.

In 2015, he played for Stal Dniprodzerzhynsk in the Ukrainian Premier League.

International career
Homenyuk was called up for the Ukraine national football team on 1 June 2008, in a friendly match against Sweden which Ukraine won 1–0.

References

External links
Player Profile on Official Website of Tavriya
Player Profile on Website Football Agency "S.V.S."

Ukrainian footballers
1985 births
Living people
FC Ikva Mlyniv players
SC Tavriya Simferopol players
FC Dnipro players
FC Arsenal Kyiv players
FC Metalist Kharkiv players
FC Stal Kamianske players
Ukrainian Premier League players
Ukraine international footballers
Association football forwards
Ukrainian football managers
NK Veres Rivne managers
Sportspeople from Rivne Oblast